Ruth Wilson is a British missing person. She is from Betchworth, near Dorking in Surrey, England and disappeared in Box Hill on 27 November 1995. Her whereabouts are unknown.

Family and home life
Ruth Wilson is the elder daughter of Ian and Nesta Wilson. Her mother was born in Wellingborough on 1 May 1948 and was given the name Nesta Landeg by her adoptive parents. Ian and Nesta were married in 1976 in Newport. When Wilson was three years old and her sister, Jenny, a few months old, Nesta killed herself on 10 December 1982. According to the story told to Wilson by the family, Nesta's death was a result of an accidental fall down stairs, but her death certificate recorded her cause of death as suicide by hanging. Unbeknownst to her family, Wilson became aware of the true nature of her mother's death before she disappeared.

Wilson's father, Ian G. Wilson, married Karen I. Bowerman in the last quarter of 1983 in Surrey. Ian and Karen were teachers: he was head of science at a secondary school while she was the deputy head of a primary school. Ian also served as a local parish councillor. The family lived in a cottage on Wonham Lane in Betchworth, Surrey at the time of Wilson's disappearance.

Wilson enjoyed reading, going on bike rides and music. She played the electric guitar and piano. She also had a Saturday job working in a music shop and was a popular local babysitter. She was studying for her A levels at The Ashcombe School Sixth Form when she disappeared. She attended her local church, St Michael’s. She was a member of the choir, played the organ and enjoyed bell-ringing. She was described by school friends as having an intelligent and quirky personality with a small but close-knit group of friends.

Wilson's friend Catherine Mair was due to move to Sheffield, South Yorkshire, and Wilson had asked if she could come with her once she was settled. Wilson went missing a few weeks after Mair moved. Mair's mother recalled that Wilson had slept over not long before she disappeared and had been adamant that she did not want to go back home. Wilson did not explain why. Mair has stated that Wilson had talked about running away but not suicide. Ian and Karen have disputed claims that her home life was unhappy. Friends and family have also said that Ruth was not suicidal.

Events
Two days before her disappearance, Wilson worked her usual job in a music shop in Dorking, then went for a meal with her ex-boyfriend Will Kennedy, with whom she still maintained a good friendship, and another friend, Neil Phillipson. Kennedy and Phillipson both stated that Wilson paid for the meal.

On the day before she disappeared, Wilson went for handbell practice at the local church, then went to a youth group in Dorking, then back to Kennedy's for supper. His mother gave her some old clothing. Her family remembered her being relaxed.

Disappearance
Wilson's father and stepmother left early for work on the day of her disappearance, leaving Wilson and Jenny to catch the school bus. Wilson's father had an Ofsted inspection at the school where he worked as the head of the science department and was in a hurry to leave. He recalled that he last saw Wilson listening to her Walkman as he left the home and he had been in a stressful mood, his last words to Wilson were "Out of my way. I'm in a hurry" as he pushed past her. At the last moment Wilson told Jenny that she was not going with her on the bus. Jenny was not surprised as Wilson was in the sixth form and did not always come in for the whole day, though she was surprised that her sister left it so late to tell her before the arrival of the bus.

Shortly after Jenny left for school, Kennedy appeared with his car and offered Wilson a lift. She declined, saying she would meet up later. She did not attend school at all that day, something her family and peers considered uncharacteristic. At around 11.30 am, Wilson took a taxi into Dorking. Around midday, she ordered flowers for her stepmother from Thistles Florists at 257 Dorking High Street. Wilson asked that they not be delivered until the following Wednesday.

Wilson spent the afternoon in Dorking Library. Around 4 pm she took a taxi from Dorking railway station to Box Hill. She was dropped off on a bridleway a short way from the Hand in Hand pub (now The Box Tree) on Box Hill. The taxi driver stated that Wilson displayed unusual behaviour in that she simply stood still in the rain as he drove off. This was notable as the taxi driver observed that people typically walk away after they have been dropped off. In other reports the taxi driver stated that Wilson appeared to be looking round for someone. The taxi driver was the last person to see her at 4.30 pm.

At the time of her disappearance Wilson was wearing a red knitted jumper, black velvet trousers, black pixie boots and a small lady's watch on her left wrist. She had a small blue duffel bag with a personal stereo and tapes. Liam McAuley, a 58-year-old retired police officer investigating the disappearance, observed that Wilson was 'dressed to get into another car' or was standing still to wait for the taxi driver to leave so he did not see where she was going to go, implying that a third party may have been involved and running away seemed more likely than suicide. McAuley also stated that disappearing completely would be ‘very difficult’. Wilson disappeared 14 days before the 13th anniversary of her mother's death.

Aftermath
Wilson's family became concerned when Wilson did not return home that evening and they had discovered from her school that she had not attended classes that day. They telephoned the police, and using information from the taxi driver who dropped Ruth on Box Hill reported fairly early on, local police officers conducted a search of the immediate area.  

That night Surrey Police organised a more extensive search for Wilson with a helicopter, police dogs and heat-seeking equipment. They searched the Box Hill area but found no solid clues as to her whereabouts. It was subsequently discovered that she frequently went to Box Hill after school. She was also concerned about her performance at school and had kept a school report from her father and stepmother that weekend.

On 29 November, the flowers ordered by Wilson were delivered to her stepmother Karen. The flowers were described by Ian Wilson as ‘an expensive bouquet’ in subsequent reports. There was no note attached to the flowers. Wilson's friend Mair interpreted this gesture as 'sticking two fingers up' to her stepmother.

On 1 December, as reported in The Times newspaper (29 December 1995), police found three notes hidden under a bush in the undergrowth at the top edge of Betchworth Quarry on Box Hill. The notes amounted to farewells to her father, stepmother, her best friend and a teenage boy she knew. Nearby were found empty packets of paracetamol tablets and a half-empty bottle of Vermouth.

On 2 December, a large scale search was organised by the police and fire and rescue services, which included 60 volunteers comprising local members of the public, school friends, colleagues and wardens from the National Trust. The search utilised a police helicopter, tracker dogs and thermal imaging equipment. A detailed search of the Betchworth Quarry end of Box Hill was undertaken by a trained search and rescue team along with employees of the owners of the quarry Nionisle Ltd.

Mark Williams-Thomas, who was the family liaison officer for Wilson's case, stated that extensive searches across Box Hill had yielded no evidence to suggest she was killed or took her own life. He also stated that he was sure Wilson was not abducted by a stranger. Williams-Thomas also stated that "From the experience I have had, I would suggest one of two things occurred. She either went up there to meet someone and has subsequently gone away, or she went there and died in some way."

On 8 December, Ian and Karen Wilson appeared on the ITV network's mid-morning programme This Morning to appeal for information. They stated that they believed that their daughter was alive but afraid to come home.

Eight months after the disappearance, Catherine Mair was visited at her new home in Sheffield by South Yorkshire Police. The officers broke off from questioning her to look in her wardrobe, as if she might have been hiding Wilson. The police assigned the code name Operation Scholar to the case. The unsolved missing persons case is reviewed on a regular basis and is being led by DCI Alex Geldart. Surrey Police have stated that the investigation would be re-opened if any new evidence or lines of enquiry came to light.

Possible sightings 

On the first anniversary of the disappearance a girl thought to resemble Wilson was captured on CCTV at a Dorking newsagent's shop two miles from Box Hill. She was distressed and requested a copy of each of the local newspapers and became visibly upset when she was told that one had sold out. The newspaper shop owner reported the encounter to the police and saved the CCTV footage. The local newspapers featured reference to Wilson’s disappearance. Wilson's parents stated in an article in The Times on 2 January 1997 that they believed the girl in the video was Wilson.

Speaking on the tenth anniversary of Wilson's disappearance, Sgt Shane Craven, head of East Surrey police's missing persons team, stated that "In the weeks following Ruth’s disappearance there were some fairly reliable sightings of her in the Dorking area by people who knew her well". Sightings have been reported as far afield as Canada. A Surrey Advertiser article by Rebecca Younger (dated 9 December 2008) announced an appeal to mark the 13th anniversary of the disappearance. The missing persons team have stated that they followed up every lead.

In 2006, Ian Wilson wrote an open letter to his missing daughter, imploring her to come home and asking if anyone had information as to her whereabouts.

In 2018, a local newspaper sent out an appeal to anyone who had known Wilson at the time to come forward with any information that could shed light on the disappearance. Roxy Birch, who had known Wilson at school and portrayed her in a police reconstruction video, claimed that Wilson did not drive and did not own a passport at the time of her disappearance, which would have made long-distance and international travel more difficult. Another friend Kay Blenard stated 'My belief is that she had planned to do something. I don’t know whether that would be permanent or temporary. I’d also like to believe that someone knows what happened'.

The same year, Jon Savell, the chief superintendent of public protection of Surrey Police gave a review of the case in which he stated; "There are five explanations for Ruth Wilson’s disappearance; A tragic accident, abduction, suicide, murder, or that she had absented herself to start a new life."

Documentary
A documentary film about the case titled Vanished: the Surrey Schoolgirl was produced in 2018. It introduced some new witnesses, mainly friends of Wilson. Wilson's father and stepmother were asked if they wanted to be involved, but declined the offer.

See also
List of people who disappeared

References

External links
Vanished documentary in full

1995 in England
1990s in Surrey
1990s missing person cases
Box Hill, Surrey
Missing person cases in England
November 1995 events in the United Kingdom
Missing English children